Kapil Mohan is a 1990 batch Indian civil servant. He has served in the Ministry of Power for the Government of India during which he implemented RAPDRP and RGGVY.

Currently he is the Principal Secretary and Chairman of BESCOM, HESCOM, CESCOM and PCKL. He also holds the concurrent charge as the principal secretary for Ports Infrastructure and Inland water transport.

He was previously serving as Principal Secretary to the State Government of Karnataka and looking after Infrastructure Development Department. The department looks after major infrastructure projects in Airports and Railways sectors.. He was previously working as Principal Secretary Housing, Govt of Karnataka and Interim Authority of Real Estate Regulatory Authority(RERA), Karnataka.

Early life and education
Kapil Mohan was born in Bengaluru, Karnataka, India. He attended the Woodrow Wilson School of Public and International Affairs, Princeton University, USA, as a McNamara Fellowship in the areas of public policy and science, technology, and environmental policy. Kapil Mohan is a management graduate with a background in science.

Career
He is a 1990 batch IAS officer of the Karnataka Cadre. He is also having the additional post as the Principal Secretary Housing Board, Govt of Karnataka. And he is also appointed as Interim Authority of Real Estate Regulatory Authority (RERA).

Kapil Mohan IAS held the charge of Youth Empowerment and sports department which oversees youth affairs and sports development in the state. He held the charge of Education department which looks after primary and secondary education in the state.

Kapil Mohan IAS worked as Managing Director of Krishna Bhagya Jala Nigam Limited, a Govt. of Karnataka Undertaking. KBJNL is responsible for the development, operation, and maintenance of irrigation and maintenance of irrigation systems in Upper Krishna Project area. It is responsible for operation and maintenance of 6.07 lakh hectares of the command area.

Awards and recognition 
2001: Kapil Mohan IAS won the prestigious St. Andrews Prize on environment awarded internationally competitive basis.

2004: Kapil Mohan became Fellow of Leadership in Environment and Development (LEAD), an international organization working in the area of promotion of leadership in fields of environment and development.

Kapil Mohan IAS was also elected as Director of LEAD in 2005

2008: Kapil Mohan received Massachusetts Institute Technology – IFMR award in an international competition on original work in urban development.

2009: Kapil Mohan was selected as Eisenhower Fellow from India on energy issue.  The selection committee in India was headed by Mr. Kumarmangalam Birla and in USA by Gen. Colin Powell.

2013: Kapil Mohan was selected as one of the 60 Fellows who have made the transformational impact in 60 years of Eisenhower fellowship existence in 2013.

Experience

 Principal Secretary to Government Public Enterprises Department.Kapil Mohan served as Principal Secretary to Public Enterprises which supervises the Public sector companies of the State and also deals with privatization and disinvestment issues.01/08/2018 to 19/07/2019
Principal Secretary to Government, Housing Department, Government of Karnataka.  Kapil Mohan was serving as Principal Secretary to the State Government of Karnataka and looking after Housing Department. The Department of Housing promotes housing in the State and deals with all policy and implementation related issues. The department is promoting green affordable housing in a big way.  21-4-2017 to 01-8-2018.
 Interim Real Estate Regulatory Authority, Government of Karnataka. Kapil Mohan is serving as the Interim Real Estate Regulatory Authority for regulation and promotion of the real estate sector in the State of Karnataka. 14-7-2017 to 01-08-2018.
 Chairman, Karnataka Appellate Tribunal, Government of Karnataka   Kapil Mohan was working as Chairman, Karnataka Appellate Tribunal (KAT). This is the higher appellate authority for the state for majority of the state acts. KAT is a State level appellate body which adjudicates over 30 Acts of state covering Revenue, Forest, Sales tax, Excise, Co-operation and Registration etc.  1-6-2016 to 31-1-2018.(1 year 7 months)
 Principal Secretary to Govt., Youth Services and Sports Department, Government of Karnataka. Kapil Mohan was held the charge of Youth Services and sports department which oversees youth affairs and sports development in the state. In this period youth fellowship program and activities to promote sports and development of Youth were taken up.(10 months)
 Principal Secretary to Government, Government of Karnataka, Kapil Mohan held the charge of Education department which looks after primary and secondary education in the state.(2 months)
 Managing Director, Krishna Bhagya Jala Nigam Limited, Water Resources Department Govt. Of Karnataka. Kapil Mohan had worked as Managing Director of Krishna Bhagya Jala Nigam Limited, A Govt. Of Karnataka Undertaking. KBJNL is responsible for development, operation and maintenance of irrigation and maintenance of irrigation systems in Upper Krishna Project area.  It is responsible for operation and maintenance of 6.07 lakh hectares of command area.  The Nigam is a corporation with an asset base of Rs.10,445.00 crores and 3500 employees.  The Nigam has recently launched UKP Stage III which aims at utilizing 130.90 TMC of water in 7 years at a cost of Rs.17,207.00 crores and creating 5.30 lakh hectares of irrigation potential.  The Nigam is also implementing national pilot on improving water use efficiency in UKP Stage I and II by 25% under National Water Commission at a cost of Rs.4085 crores. The project was envisaged by him. He have also launched a pioneering program.(3 years 6 months)
 Principal Secretary Water Resources Department, Water Resources Department, Government of Karnataka. Kapil Mohan was also holding additional charge as Principal Secretary of Water Resources Department, Government of Karnataka from 03-02-2014 to 18-09-2014. The Water Resources Department is responsible for planning, development and management of medium and major irrigation projects in Karnataka, WRD, GOK is implementing major projects like Upper Krishna Project, Upper Bhadra Project and Yettinahole drinking of water projects.
 Managing Director Karnataka Renewable Energy Ltd. Energy Department Government of Karnataka. Kapil Mohan was holding additional charge from September 2012 to February 2013 as Managing Director, Karnataka Renewable Energy Development Limited (KREDL), A Govt. Of Karnataka Undertaking, Bangalore. KREDL is nodal agency for promotion of all renewable terms of energy, energy efficiency and conservation in State of Karnataka. It has notable successes in setting up wind, solar and small hydro projects in the State. In my stint we set up the first solar part in Karnataka and also set up off grid solar power solution to power computerized citizen centers in rural areas and in more than 150 locations.
 Managing Director, Karnataka State Finance Corporation, Finance Department Govt. Of Karnataka. Kapil Mohan held additional charge of KSFC for a period of 6 months. KSFC is the lead agency of state for financing small and medium enterprises.(6 months)
 Deputy Director, General Bureau of Energy Efficiency. Govt. of India. Bureau of Energy Efficiency, Ministry of Power Kapil Mohan launched the National Mission on Enhanced Energy Efficiency (NMEEE), which is part of the National Action Plan for Climate Change (NAPCC), which seeks to improve energy efficiency in eight major energy consuming sectors of economy. The PAT component of NMEE will lay down compulsory energy efficiency targets for major industries of the country.(1 year)
 Director, Government of India, Ministry of Power. Kapil Mohan worked as Director (Distribution) in-charge of Flagship Schemes of Govt. Of India, viz., RGGVY, and RAPDRP, RGGVY with an outlay of Rs.33,000 cr. Aims at electrification of all Indian villages by 2012. RAPDRP with an outlay of Rs.56,000 cr. Aims at reducing distribution loses to 15% by mid 13th plan. He also set up the India Smart grid Forum  and Smart grid Task-force of India an inter ministerial body to develop smart grids in India.(3 years)
 PS to Union Minister of State for Road Transport & Highways, Govt. Of India. Ministry of Road Transport & Highways  Kapil Mohan Worked as PS to Minister of State (RT&H) from 2004 to 2006. Phase III to VII of National Highways Development Programme were launched at that time.(2 years)
 Additional Commissioner, Govt. Of Karnataka. Bangalore City Corporation   Kapil Mohan was in charge of IT, engineering and infrastructure projects divisions of the fastest growing city in India.(6 months)
 Deputy Commissioner, Govt. Of Karnataka. Dharwad District   Kapil Mohan was Deputy Commissioner of two most economically advanced districts of the State for 5 years. The largest cities of Karnataka, Hubli-Dharwad and Mangalore were the district headquarters. He also held additional charges of Administrator, Urban Development Authority and KCC Bank in Dharwad during these shifts.( 2 years)
 CEO, Zilla Panchayat, Govt. Of Karnataka. Gulbarga District.   Kapil Mohan was CEO of the largest Zilla Panchayat in Karnataka. Kapil Mohan was ranked as best CEO in the State for 3 years.
 Deputy Secretary, Govt. Of Karnataka.Finance Department   Kapil Mohan was responsible for budget preparation and resources monitoring of the State Government.(3 years)
 Assistant Commissioner, Govt. Of Karnataka. Bellary District   Kapil Mohan served as Assistant Commissioner of Bellary Sub-division.(2 years)

== References ==

1963 births
Living people